Bharat Gold Mines Limited or in short BGML is a public sector undertaking of the Government of India. It owns Kolar Gold Fields.

External links 

Cheating MP Mla mc in kgf

Cyanide Dust
SC Orders Tendering to reopen BGML
Call for Service Provider to float "Global Tender"

Defunct mining companies
Defunct companies of India
Economic history of Karnataka
Gold mining companies of India